Spion Kop is a small residential and former industrial area in Nottinghamshire, England, stretching for a few hundred yards on both sides of the main A60 road surrounded by open farmland. It is in the civil parish of Warsop.

It is located about a mile to the south of Warsop on the A60, Mansfield Road. It is a settlement built and named after the Battle of Spion Kop which took place during the Second Boer War in Natal, South Africa, in January 1900. A major military figure in the conflict was John Talbot Coke, grandson of D'Ewes Coke, born at Mansfield Woodhouse, a well-known Nottinghamshire industrialist and clergyman. At Mansfield Woodhouse a Coke Street was renamed Newhaven Avenue.

The one residential side-street adjoining the main A60 road formerly known as George Street has been renamed Mosscar Close.

A modern, large-scale mixed-residential development has been built on the extensive site of the old Wood Brothers timber business on Mansfield Road following a successful planning application to Mansfield District Council in 2011.

References

External links

Villages in Nottinghamshire
Mansfield District